Francis Hsu Chen-Ping ; (20 February 192023 May 1973), was a Chinese clergyman. He was the third bishop, (the first ethnically-Chinese one), of the Roman Catholic Diocese of Hong Kong.

Born into a Methodist family in Shanghai, Hsu joined the Catholic Church when he was teaching at a National Central University in Nanking between 1944 and 1947. He studied at St. John's University, Shanghai in 1936. He was awarded Master of Arts from Merton College, Oxford.

Hsu escaped to Hong Kong in 1950 after the Kuomintang left mainland China. He was later ordained a Priest in Rome on 14 March 1959. Hsu was the editor of Kung Kao Po, a Catholic newspaper in Hong Kong, from 1959 to 1965. On 1 July 1967, he was appointed Auxiliary Bishop of Hong Kong and Titular Bishop of Orrea. After the resignation of Lorenzo Bianchi in 1969, he was appointed bishop of Hong Kong.

Francis Hsu died in Hong Kong on 23 May 1973 from a heart attack.

See also
Roman Catholic Diocese of Hong Kong

References

External links
His Biography by the Catholic Church

1920 births
1973 deaths
20th-century Roman Catholic bishops in China
Roman Catholic bishops of Hong Kong
Converts to Roman Catholicism from Methodism
Hong Kong Roman Catholic bishops
People from Shanghai
St. John's University, Shanghai alumni
Alumni of Merton College, Oxford